iCar was a British automobile magazine published by Future. 

It was launched in May 2011 as a quarterly car magazine, edited by Jeremy Laird. 

The magazine's aim was to cover more sustainable cars. It was very short-lived, with only two issues being published before being closed in August 2011.

References

2011 establishments in the United Kingdom
2011 disestablishments in the United Kingdom
Automobile magazines published in the United Kingdom
Quarterly magazines published in the United Kingdom
Defunct magazines published in the United Kingdom
Magazines established in 2011
Magazines disestablished in 2011